The 1970 Tirreno–Adriatico was the fifth edition of the Tirreno–Adriatico cycle race and was held from 11 March to 15 March 1970. The race was won by Antoine Houbrechts.

General classification

References

1970
1970 in Italian sport